Nargeseh (also known as Nārgīz and Nārgīz Bāla) is a village in Dowreh Rural District, Chegeni District, Dowreh County, Lorestan Province, Iran. At the 2006 census, its population was 143, in 35 families.

References 

Towns and villages in Dowreh County